Ghuddi is a 1980 Bangladeshi romantic drama film directed by Syed Salahuddin Zaki, who also wrote story, screenplay and dialogue. It is the first film directed by Salahuddin Zakir. Subarna Mustafa has played the main role in film with Raisul Islam Asad, Nasir Uddin Yusuf, Tariq Anam Khan, Nayla Azad Nupur, Syed Hasan Imam and Happy Akhand in supporting roles.। Subarna Mustafa debuted in the film. In the film, Raisul Islam Asad was a freedom fighter in the film and he is also a freedom fighter in the real life.

Ghuddi was released on 19 December 1980. In the film, Syed Salahuddin Zaki won best dialogue writer award and Shafiqul Islam Swapan won the Best Cinematography award for the 6th Bangladesh National Film Awards.

Cast
 Raisul Islam Asad - Asad
 Subarna Mustafa - Ghuddi
 Nasiruddin Yousuff - Bachchu
 Tariq Anam Khan - Tariq
 Nayla Azad Nupur - Nupur
 Syed Hasan Imam - Mr. Hasan, Ghuddi's father
 Jhumur Akhter Riya as Sathi
 Golam Mustafa - Majhi
 Happy Akhand - Happy, Ghuddi's friend (Special Appearance)
 Farid Ali
 Mahbub Ali
 Rokeya Abbas
 Mamun Chowdhury
 Arun Dutt

Music

Ghuddi's music directed was by Lucky Akhand. The film is praised for its excellent music, especially Happy Akhand's performance. Lyrics by Kausar Ahmed Chaudhury. The songs are performed by Happy Akhand, Syed Abdul Hadi, Shahnaz Rahmatullah and Shimul Yusuf and Linu Billah.

Soundtrack

Personnel
Singer(s)
 Happy Akhand
 Shahnaz Rahmatullah
 Syed Abdul Hadi
 Shimul Yousuf
 Linu Billah

Composition, Music, Music Arrangement
 Lucky Akhand

Lyricist(s)
 S.M Hedayat
 Kausar Ahmed Chaudhury
 Syed Salahuddin Zaki

Awards
National Film Awards

 Won: Best Dialogue - Syed Salahuddin Zaki
 Won: Best Choreography - Shafiqul Islam Swapan

References

External links

 

1980 romantic drama films
1980 films
Bengali-language Bangladeshi films
Bangladeshi romantic drama films
1980s Bengali-language films
Best Film Bachsas Award winners